Fomalhaut b, formally named Dagon, is a directly imaged extrasolar object and former candidate planet observed near the A-type main-sequence star Fomalhaut, approximately 25 light-years away in the constellation of Piscis Austrinus. The object's potential discovery was initially announced in 2008 and confirmed in 2012 via images taken with the Advanced Camera for Surveys (ACS) on the Hubble Space Telescope. Under the working hypothesis that the object was a planet, it was reported in January 2013, that it had a highly elliptical orbit with a period of 1,700 Earth years, assuming the object is planetary. The planetary hypothesis has since fallen out of favor (more recently gathered data suggests a dust or debris cloud is far more likely), and most recent analysis places the object on an escape trajectory.

The true nature of Fomalhaut b is the subject of significant debate. Fomalhaut b was initially identified as one of the first exoplanets to be directly imaged: its detection was attributed to reflected light from circumplanetary material (e.g. a dust ring) and thermal emission from a jovian planet atmosphere. Later, Fomalhaut b was described as a low-mass planet which was only detected due to its surrounding dust cloud or, most recently, debris from a collision of asteroids instead. On May 7, 2020, the NASA exoplanet archive officially removed Fomalhaut b from its list of exoplanet candidates (confirmed or not).

The object was one of those selected by the International Astronomical Union as part of NameExoWorlds, their public process for giving proper names to exoplanets. The process involved public nomination and voting for the new name. In December 2015, the IAU announced the winning name was Dagon. The name Dagon was proposed by Dr. Todd Vaccaro and forwarded by the St. Cloud State University Planetarium to the IAU for consideration. Dagon was a Semitic deity, often represented as half-man, half-fish.

Summary
The most likely composition of Fomalhaut b is a dust cloud. As a possible alternative, Fomalhaut b could be a planet less than twice Jupiter's mass that is enshrouded in a spherical cloud of dust from ongoing planetesimal collisions.

Fomalhaut b's discovery and preliminary identification as an exoplanet was announced at the same time as three others around HR 8799, described as the first directly imaged extra-solar planets (among earlier claims such as e.g. 2M1207 b, GQ Lup b, DH Tau b, AB Pic b, CHXR 73 b, UScoCTIO 108 b, CT Cha b, 1RXS 1609 b) in that their emission was thought to originate at least in part from a planetary atmosphere.  However, subsequent studies from the Spitzer Space Telescope and a reanalysis of the original HST data instead suggest that Fomalhaut b's light is scattered starlight, not planet thermal emission.

Initial discovery by Hubble 

The existence of a massive planet orbiting Fomalhaut was (questionably) inferred from Hubble observations published in 2005 that resolved the structure of Fomalhaut's massive, cold debris disk (or dust belt/ring).  The belt is not centered on the star, and has a sharper inner boundary than would normally be expected.  The initial theory was that a massive planet on a wide orbit but located interior to this debris ring could clear out parent bodies and dust in its vicinity, leaving the ring appearing to have a sharp inner edge and making it appear offset from the star.

In May 2008, Paul Kalas, James Graham and their collaborators identified Fomalhaut b from Hubble/ACS images taken in 2004 and 2006 at visible wavelengths (i.e. 0.6 and 0.8 μm). NASA released the composite discovery photograph on November 13, 2008, coinciding with the publication of discovery by Kalas et al. in Science.

Kalas remarked, "It's a profound and overwhelming experience to lay eyes on a planet never before seen. I nearly had a heart attack at the end of May when I confirmed that Fomalhaut b orbits its parent star." In the image, the bright outer oval band is the dust ring, while the features inside of this band represent noise from scattered starlight.

Early follow-up observations and doubts 
In the paper which had asserted discovery, Kalas and collaborators suggested that Fomalhaut b's emission originates from two sources: from circumplanetary dust scattering starlight and from planet thermal emission. Here, the former explains most of the 0.6 μm brightness and planet thermal emission contributes to much of the 0.8 μm brightness. Their non-detections with ground-based infrared data suggested that Fomalhaut b could not be more massive than about three times Jupiter's mass if it were a planet. 

However, Fomalhaut b should be detectable in space-based infrared data if its mass is between 1-3 times Jupiter's mass and it is a planet. On the contrary, observations from the infrared-sensitive Spitzer Space Telescope failed to detect Fomalhaut b, implying that Fomalhaut b has less mass than Jupiter if it is a planet.  Furthermore, although Dagon was thought to be a plausible explanation for Fomalhaut's eccentric debris ring, measurements in the Kalas et al. paper hinted that it was moving too fast (i.e. not apsidally aligned) for this explanation to work.  Finally, researchers analyzing September–October 2011 data from the ALMA for Fomalhaut's debris ring suggested an alternate hypothesis: that the ring could be shaped by much smaller, shepherding planets, neither of which needed to be Fomalhaut b.  These results invoked skepticism about Fomalhaut b's status as an extrasolar planet.

Recovery, independent confirmation by Hubble and further additional findings
On October 24, 2012, a team led by Thayne Currie at the University of Toronto announced the first independent recovery of Fomalhaut b and revived the claim that Fomalhaut b identifies a planet. They reanalyzed the original Hubble data using new, more powerful algorithms for separating planet light from starlight and confirmed that Fomalhaut b does exist. They also provided a new detection of Fomalhaut b at 0.4 µm.
They modeled the optical detection and infrared upper limits for Fomalhaut b, showing that Fomalhaut b's emission can be completely explained by starlight scattered by small dust and arguing that this dust surrounds an unseen planetary-mass object. Thus, they consider Fomalhaut b to plausibly be a "planet identified from direct imaging" even if Fomalhaut b is not, strictly speaking, a directly imaged planet insofar as the light does not come from a planetary atmosphere.

A second paper made public a day later and led by Raphael Galicher and Christian Marois at the Herzberg Institute of Astrophysics also independently recovered Fomalhaut b and confirmed the new 0.4 µm detection, claiming the spectral energy distribution (SED) of Fomalhaut b cannot be explained as due to direct or scattered radiation from a massive planet. They considered two models to explain the SED: (1) a large circumplanetary disk around a massive, but unseen, planet and (2) the aftermath of a collision during the past 100 years of two Kuiper belt objects of radii about 50 km.

Subsequent Hubble data obtained in 2010 and 2012 with the STIS instrument by Paul Kalas and collaborators again recovered Fomalhaut b. However, analysis of Fomalhaut b's astrometry showed that the object has a high eccentricity (e = 0.8), its orbit (projected on the sky) crosses the plane of Fomalhaut's debris ring, and thus it is unlikely to be the object sculpting the debris ring's sharp inner edge.  Fomalhaut b's high eccentricity may be evidence for a significant dynamical interaction with a hitherto unseen planet at a smaller orbital separation.

Analyses of additional STIS data obtained in 2013 and 2014 argue that Fomalhaut b is fading and expanding in size, a behavior that may support the interpretation of Fomalhaut b as a collision between two asteroid-sized objects.

The revival of the claim that Fomalhaut b is (possibly) a planet after it had been discounted led some to nickname the object a "zombie planet", although this is a non-technical term used in press material and does not appear in any peer-reviewed manuscript.

Physical characteristics

Other hypothesized planets 
Based on the (now disproven) assumption that Fomalhaut b was a gaseous planet, the existence of additional planets closer to the star had been postulated. Fomalhaut b would be orbiting its host star at a wide separation, where forming massive planets is difficult. To explain its current location, Fomalhaut b would have had to be dynamically scattered by a more massive, unseen body located at smaller separations. Several ground-based observations have searched for this hypothetical Fomalhaut c, but have yet to find it. At very small, Solar-System-like scales, any additional companions must have a mass less than thirteen times that of Jupiter. At slightly larger scales, comparable to the locations of the planets around HR 8799, any additional planets of Fomalhaut must have masses below about 2 to 7 Jupiter masses. A gaseous planet in an orbit like Fomalhaut b could have formed in situ if it coalesced from small pebble-sized objects that rapidly formed into a protoplanetary core which in turn accreted a gaseous envelope.

Gallery

See also 
 Direct imaging of extrasolar planets
 List of extrasolar planets
 List of star systems within 25–30 light-years

References

External links 
Hubblecast 22: Hubble directly observes planet orbiting Fomalhaut
Preprint of recovery/confirmation paper
Preprint of discovery paper
Preprint of prediction paper
NASA's Hubble reveals rogue planetary orbit for Fomalhaut b

Piscis Austrinus
Exoplanets detected by direct imaging
Exoplanets with proper names
Disproven exoplanets
Astronomical objects discovered in 2008
Dagon